Arthur Austin (July 8, 1902 – February 4, 1962) was an American water polo player who competed in the 1924 Summer Olympics. He was born and died in California. In 1924 he was part of the American team which won the bronze medal. He played all five matches.

In 1979, he was inducted into the USA Water Polo Hall of Fame.

See also
 List of Olympic medalists in water polo (men)

References

External links
 

1902 births
1962 deaths
American male water polo players
Water polo players at the 1924 Summer Olympics
Olympic bronze medalists for the United States in water polo
Medalists at the 1924 Summer Olympics
20th-century American people